Sessions is an EP by the American punk rock band the Descendents, released in 1997 through Sessions Records and consisting of two tracks from the recording of their 1996 album Everything Sucks. "Gotta" was written by and features the band's original bassist Tony Lombardo; it was left off of the album and used as a B-side for the "When I Get Old" single. "Grand Theme" is an instrumental track that was included on the album as a hidden track following "Thank You".

Track listing

Personnel 

Band
Karl Alvarez – bass guitar
Milo Aukerman – vocals
Stephen Egerton – guitar, producer, engineer
Bill Stevenson – drums, producer, engineer

Additional musicians
Tony Lombardo – bass guitar on "Gotta"
Chad Price – backing vocals
 
Production
Jason Livermore – additional engineering
Andy Wallace – mix engineer
Steve Sisco – assistant mix engineer
Howie Weinberg – mastering

References

Descendents EPs
1997 EPs